Fuzzy Math may refer to:

In mathematics, Fuzzy mathematics.
In education, a derogatory term for Reform mathematics.
A derogatory political term, Fuzzy math (politics)